Ohio's 11th congressional district special election, 2008 took place on November 18, 2008. The seat of the U.S. representative for Ohio's 11th congressional district was vacated following the death of Democrat Stephanie Tubbs Jones on August 20, 2008. Since more than one candidate from the Democratic Party filed to take part in the election, a primary was held on October 14, 2008. The special election was won by Marcia Fudge.

Candidates

Democratic primary election 
Fifteen Democratic candidates qualified for the primary election, fourteen of whom appeared on the ballot and one of which qualified as a write-in candidate. Four candidates withdrew, but their names still appeared on the ballot. Votes for such candidates were not counted.

Brahim Ayad – A write-in candidate
Marcia L. Fudge – Mayor of Warrensville Heights who was picked by county Democratic Party to replace Jones in the regular election
Gerald Henley
Carolyn Johnson
Jeffrey Johnson
Jim Joyner – Withdrawal via letter dated September 19
Nathaniel Martin
Marvin McMickle – Withdrawal via letter dated September 15
Bill Patmon – Withdrawal via letter dated September 12
Isaac Powell
C. J. Prentiss – Withdrawal via letter dated September 15
Frank Rives
Sean Ryan
Thomas Wheeler

Special election 
Only Marcia L. Fudge appeared on the ballot for the special election.

Results

Democratic primary election

Special election

See also
United States House of Representatives elections in Ohio, 2008

References 

Ohio 2008 11
Ohio 2008 11
2008 11 Special
Ohio 11 Special
United States House of Representatives 11 Special
United States House of Representatives 2008 11
2000s in Cleveland
Single-candidate elections